"What Do I Call You"  is a song recorded by South Korean singer Taeyeon. It was released on December 15, 2020, by SM Entertainment. The song's lyrics were penned by Kenzie while its music was composed by Linnea Södahl, Caroline Pennell, David Pramik and arranged by David Pramik. It is the title track of Taeyeon's fourth EP with the same name What Do I Call You.

Background and release 
On December 3, 2020, Taeyeon was announced to be releasing a mini album titled "What Do I Call You" and the title track with the same name. The song is described as a R&B pop that characterized by a minimalistic and rhythmic melody created by unique instruments. Its lyrics are about a girl with the lingering feelings for someone after a breakup.

"What Do I Call You" and its music video were released on December 15. In the music video, Taeyeon took inspiration from the 2004 movie Eternal Sunshine of the Spotless Mind as she attempted to forget memories of a certain. Taeyeon later filmed a live clip performance of the song, which was released on December 23.

On January 1, 2021, Taeyeon performed "What Do I Call You" live for the first time at SMTOWN Live Culture Humanity online concert.

Commercial performance
"What Do I Call You" debuted at number 14 on South Korea's Gaon Digital Chart for the chart issue dated December 13–19, 2020. It additionally peaked at number 15 on the Billboard K-pop Hot 100 chart.

Personnel 
Credits are adapted from the CD booklet of What Do I Call You.

 Korean lyrics by Kenzie
 Composed by Linnea Södahl, Caroline Pennell, David Pramik
 Arranged by David Pramik
 Directed by Kenzie
 Background vocals by Taeyeon, Caroline Pennell
 Recorded by Minji Noh at S.M. Yellow Tail Studio
 Mixed by Kim Chul-soon at S.M. Blue Ocean Studio
 Digital Editing by Kang Eunji at SM SSAM Studio
 Engineered for Mix by Lee Ji-hong at SM LVYIN Studio

Charts

Weekly charts

Monthly charts

Year-end chart

Accolades

Music programs

Awards ceremony

Release history

See also 
 List of Inkigayo Chart winners (2020)

References 

2020 songs
2020 singles
SM Entertainment singles
Korean-language songs
Taeyeon songs
South Korean contemporary R&B songs
Songs written by Kenzie (songwriter)
Songs written by Caroline Pennell
Songs written by Linnea Södahl
Songs written by David Pramik